Michael Brunnock (born 1 September 1964) is an Irish singer-songwriter, and musician. He is known as having been a member of the Irish bands Little Palace and The Van Winkles, and performed with Dead Can Dance's Brendan Perry. After moving to New York, Brunnock gained critical acclaim as a solo artist when he worked with Record producer, Pat Dillett and also The Ceasars.

He released hits in the US as a solo artist like "Fallen Leaves" in 2007 on his album So I do. He has toured extensively all over the world, joined by many popular artists. In 2012, along with David Byrne and Will Oldham, he won the David Di Donatello award 2012 in the Best Original Song category for his performance of "If it falls, it falls" in the movie This Must Be the Place directed by Paolo Sorrentino.

Discography

So I do
 Fallen Leaves
 Man Overboard
 Shine
 Give
 Mis-underestimation
 Little Boy Blue
 Dance to the wind
 Born Again
 Niagara Falls
 Breast Plate
 Words
 Secret

The Orchard
 Circle
 Soft White and Indigo
 Man Overboard
 The Orchard
 Untouchable
 Song of the Lark
 Change
 Every Step
 Wine
 Hansel
 Game Changer
 Sensation
 Down by the Araglin

Live in New York
 Fallen Leaves  
 Shine  
 Give  
 Misunderestimation  
 Breastplate  
 Dance to the Wind  
 Niagara Falls  
 Sensation [feat. Moe Holmes] 
 Born Again  
 Exit Strategy  
 Wounded Knee  
 Words

2013
 Red Line-  (Michael Brunnock and The Ceasars)

2014
 Peaches and Cream - (Michael Brunnock and The Ceasars)

2016
 The Landing
 The Ghost of Roger Casement

References

External links
 Official Web Site

Irish male singer-songwriters
1964 births
Living people